Trisilane is the silane with the formula H2Si(SiH3)2. A liquid at standard temperature and pressure, it is a silicon analogue of propane. In contrast with propane, however, trisilane ignites spontaneously in air.

Synthesis
Trisilane was characterized by Alfred Stock having prepared it by the reaction of hydrochloric acid and magnesium silicide. This reaction had been explored as early as 1857 by Friedrich Woehler and Heinrich Buff, and further investigated by Henri Moissan and Samuel Smiles in 1902.

Decomposition
The key property of trisilane is its thermal lability.  It degrades to silicon films and SiH4 according to this idealized equation:
Si3H8  →  Si  +  2 SiH4
In terms of mechanism, this decomposition  proceeds by a 1,2 hydrogen shift that produces disilanes, normal and isotetrasilanes, and normal and isopentasilanes.

Because it readily decomposes to leave films of Si, trisilane has been explored a means to apply thin layers of silicon for semiconductors and similar applications.  Similarly, thermolysis of trisilane gives silicon nanowires.

References

Silanes
Inorganic compounds